Oman Telecommunications Company (Omantel) is the first telecommunications company in Oman and is the primary provider of internet services in the country. The government of Oman owns a 51% share in Omantel.

Omantel acquired 65% of WorldCall Pakistan in 2008. In the biggest transaction of its kind in Middle East & North African Region (MENA), Omantel acquired 12.1% of Zain Group stake worth of $2.19 billion in 2017, making it the second largest shareholder with 21.9% stake.

Omantel has established itself as a major international hub, with currently ten submarine cables landing in Oman, e.g. TWA, EIG, PLAG, Falcon, EPEG, SMW-3, Mena, POI, OMRAN, GBI and BBG.

In 2015 it announced a project that will implement FTTH technology in the country. The same year, it won an award for its human resources standard of quality.

Omantel is the first telecommunication operator in Oman to launch a 5G network.

See also 
 Ooredoo Oman
 Vodafone
 Telecommunications in Oman
 Telephone numbers in Oman

References

External links 
 

Telecommunications companies of Oman
Internet service providers of Oman
Telecommunications companies established in 1996
Omani brands